Omophron chelys is a species of ground beetle in the family Carabidae. It is distributed in northeastern India, in the state of Sikkim.

Description
The species has a length of approximately 4.0 mm and a width of approximately 2.7 mm. Its colouring is generally testaceous (dull brick-red).

References

Further reading 
 Andrewes, H. E. (1929). The fauna of British India, including Ceylon and Burmaa. Coleoptera. Carabidae. Vol. 1. – Carabinae. London: Taylor & Francis, xviii: 139–162.
 Hurka, K. (2003). Omophroninae. In: I. Löbl & Smetana A. (Eds.) Catalogue of Palearctic Coleoptera, Vol. 1. Stenstrup: Apollo Books, 207–208.
 Semenov-Tian-Shanskij A. (1922). Carabinorum tribus Omophronina (Coleoptera) classificata. Conspectus praecursorius. Revue Russe d’Entom., 18: 36 – 45 [Классификация трибы Omophronina (Coleoptera: Carabidae). Предварительный очерк. Русск. Энтом. Обзр., XVIII]

Beetles described in 1921